Uche Lilian Ekwunife née Ogudebe born 12 January 1970), is a Nigerian politician, and Ex Nigerian Senate representing the people of Anambra Central Senatorial District of Anambra State and she is known as one of the most active female senators in the House.

Early life and education
Ekwunife was born on December 12, 1970 in Igbo-Ukwu, Anambra to Emmanuel and Lucy Ogudebe. Ekwunife attended University of Calabar and graduated with a bachelor's degree in Business and Accounting in 1993. She went on to earn her MBA degree from Nnamdi Azikiwe University in 2002.

Ekwunife had a career in banking where she rose to be an area manager. She married a businessperson from Nri community Anaocha LGA. She and Chief Larry Ekwunife have children.

Political career
Ekwunife stood for Anambra governorship election twice unsuccessfully. She was elected as a representative in 2007 for Anambra's Anaocha/Njikoka/Dunukofia constituency. She was one of 11 women elected in 2007 who were re-elected in 2011 when the lower house was nearly 95% male. Other women elected included Juliet Akano, Mulikat Adeola-Akande, Abike Dabiri, Nkiru Onyeagocha, Nnena Elendu-Ukeje, Olajumoke Okoya-Thomas, Beni Lar, Khadija Bukar Abba-Ibrahim, Elizabeth Ogbaga and Peace Uzoamaka Nnaji.

In 2015, she was elected to the Nigerian Senate. She was one of the six women elected to the 8th National Assembly. The other women were Rose Okoji Oko, Stella Oduah, Fatimat Raji Rasaki, Oluremi Tinubu and Binta Garba. Ekwunife had won the 2015 election by switching from one political party to the other. Because of this her election was challenged and in December 2015 her seat was declared vacant. Ekwunife was unable to get the support of former political party (The All Progressives Grand Alliance) for the bye-election and as a result Victor Umeh was elected as Senator.

.

She won the 2019 Anambra State senatorial elections under the platform of the People's Democratic Party representing Anambra central Senatorial District, Nigeria. defeating her 2015 rival Victor Umeh who sought reelection

References

1970 births
Living people
University of Calabar alumni
Nnamdi Azikiwe University alumni
21st-century Nigerian politicians
21st-century Nigerian women politicians
Members of the Senate (Nigeria)
Women members of the Senate (Nigeria)
Igbo politicians